Speed limits in Australia range from  shared zones to . Speed limit signage is in km/h since metrication on 1 July 1974. All speed limits (with the sole exception of the South Australian school and roadworks zones which are signposted at 25 km/h) are multiples of 10 km/h – the last digit in all speed signs is zero. Speed limits are set by state and territory legislation albeit with co-ordination and discussion between governments.

Common limits

Australian states and territories use two "default" speed limits.  These apply automatically in the absence of 'posted' speed restriction signage.  The two default speed limits are:
 within built-up areas, except for the Northern Territory which remains at 
 outside built-up areas, ; two exceptions are Western Australia and the Northern Territory at 

Common speed zones below the default built up area 50 km/h limit are:
 School zones are variable speed zones, with a  limit applying during gazetted school terms (which may include pupil-free days) and at specific times of the day when children are expected to be present. A minority of school zones have flashing lights to indicate when the lower speed limit applies. In Western Australia, every school has a flashing speed zone sign, most of which are solar powered.
 40 km/h zones. A number of local governments have implemented lower speed limits, typically 40 km/h, in certain areas, such as shopping precincts, whole suburbs such as Balmain and Rozelle in Sydney, or areas with high pedestrian activity.

Common speed zones above the default limits are:
 Many sub-arterial roads are zoned . 
 Some highways and freeways are zoned .
 Most of the Stuart, Arnhem, Barkly and Victoria highways in the Northern Territory are zoned .

The "END" speed limit sign is increasingly used throughout Australia to signal the end of a posted speed restriction, or built-up area "default" speed-limit leading to the jurisdiction's "rural" default speed limit. It contains the word "END" and a number in a black circle beneath this, representing the ceasing speed-limit.  It is typically used where, according to AS1742.4 the road beyond has certain hazards such as hidden driveways, poor camber, soft edges and other hazards where the road authority feels a posted speed limit sign might be too dangerous or otherwise unwarranted. It is intended therefore to invoke particular caution. This sign is used as a direct replacement for the slash-through speed derestriction signs common in Europe and elsewhere.

Speed limits are enforced in all areas of the country. Tolerance is about 6 km/h in urban areas and 9 km/h on highways depending on regulations of respective state such that driver driving on or below the tolerance speed will not receive a ticket. This is the case in South Australia and other states have similar tolerances. One exception is Victoria where they will deduct 2–4 km/h in from the speed reading such that reasonable doubt is credited to the driver. especially in light of the fact that earlier Australian Design Rules specified that vehicle speedometers may have up to 10% leeway in accuracy. This was updated in 2006 to require that the "speed indicated shall not be less than the true speed of the vehicle." Detection measures used are radar, LIDAR, fixed and mobile speed cameras (using various detection technologies), Vascar, pacing and aircraft.

Default speed limits by state and territory
Despite introduction of model national road rules by the states in 1999, Western Australia and the Northern Territory retain different default speed limits.  The table below indicates the default speed limits along with typical school zone limits and the highest zone in each locality.

In the external territories, and in some special cases (such as Lord Howe Island, NSW), the speed limits may differ significantly from those found across the rest of the nation.

Limits for Learner, Provisional and Probationary licence holders
The table below indicates the different speed limits that apply for each state's licence holders.

The limits apply when the roads stated speed is above the licence's speed limit, e.g.: a person with a NSW P1 licence can drive at a max speed of 90 km/h on 100/110 km/h signed roads in any state. Conversely, a person with a Queensland provisional licence is not speed limited and can drive at the road's stated speed, even while in NSW where local provisional drivers are limited to 90 km/h.

Limits for trucks and buses 

New South Wales has a limit of 100 km/h for heavy (more than 4.5 tonne) vehicles which is not a feature of the Australian Road Rules. Additionally particular heavy vehicles (some buses and vehicles more than 13.9 tonne) and are required to have speed monitoring devices fitted.

Signage

Historical limits

Historically, Australia operated a simple speed limit system of urban and rural default limits, denoted in miles per hour. As part of metrication in 1974, speed limits and speed advisories were converted into kilometres per hour, rounded to the nearest 10 km/h, leading to small discrepancies in speed limits. Also, the signage was changed from the design where the words "SPEED LIMIT" appear above the numeric limit (as specified in the current US MUTCD) to the design where the numeric limit is inscribed on a red circle (which is defined by the Vienna Convention and thus it became an international sign for speed limit).

Urban limits 

South Australia adopted   on 30 November 1950, along with the "new short-right hand turn" in place of a hook turn.

In the late 1990s and early 2000s, the  urban default limit was progressively lowered to  nationally for reasons of road, and especially pedestrian, safety. However, many existing roads, especially subarterial roads in urban areas, have had  limits posted on them. Queensland's Manual of Uniform Traffic Control Devices (Speed Controls) states that  is the general minimum speed limit for traffic-carrying roads. The Northern Territory has retained the  limit; however,  is also a common speed limit (particularly in residential areas).

Rural limits

Outside of built up areas, a prima facie speed limit applied. In New South Wales and Victoria, speed limit was 50 miles per hour (80 km/h in New South Wales after metrication). In the 1970s however, most state speed limits were gradually replaced by absolute limits.

The 50 mph limit in New South Wales became a limit of 80 km/h.

NT open speed limits 
Speed-limit advocates note that the per-capita fatality rate in 2006 was the highest in the OECD and twice the Australian average. In 2009, the opposition (Country Liberal Party) unsuccessfully sought the removal of the  limits on three out of the four highways where it applied, arguing that total fatalities in the Northern Territory had increased significantly during the first two years of the speed limit. In argument against the motion, the government provided more detailed statistics than normally published; these statistics showed a reduction in fatalities along the highways where  limits were introduced. In 2011 the opposition argued for a return to "open speed limits" 
. For the 2012 election the Country Liberals' transport policy promised an evidence-based approach. After winning government, de-restriction of Stuart Highway was proposed; a planned 12-month de-restriction was initiated on 1 February 2014. From September 2015, a  stretch of Stuart Highway between Barrow Creek and Alice Springs had speed limits removed for a 12-month trial.  speed limits were restored on 20 November 2016 due to the electoral loss of the Country Liberal Party.

Derestriction signs in NSW

	 
Often the start of rural default 'limits' or prima facie allowances were signalled by use of the speed derestriction sign, catalogued R4-2 in AS1742.4.  (2009 edition has dropped from reference the R4-2 speed derestriction). The speed derestriction sign (//) had developed 'different meaning' over time at state and territory level, although its contract-meaning under Vienna Convention on Road Signs and Signals where the sign is catalogued C17a is "End of all local prohibitions imposed on moving vehicles" and has never changed. In the Northern Territory, they designated the end of speed restrictions. In Victoria and Western Australia they meant that the rural default speed limit applied, whilst in New South Wales, they indicated that the prima facie  limit applied.
	 
	 

	 
New South Wales's prima facie  limit, often signed by derestriction signs, was only enforced in cases where a driver's speed could be demonstrated to be excessive or dangerous in the context of prevailing road conditions. This was somewhat similar in principle to "reasonable and prudent" limits in other jurisdictions. This led to the widespread but misleading belief that no limit applied, and that derestriction signs indicated an "unlimited" limit. The use of derestriction signs in New South Wales was officially discouraged, and on state controlled routes,  signs were progressively used instead.

See also

 Australian Road Rules

References

External links
 Metric Motoring (1973) – Original television advertisements explaining the conversion to metric speed limits. From the National Film and Sound Archive.

Transport law in Australia
Australia
Road transport in Australia